

Results
Arsenal's score comes first

https://www.11v11.com/teams/arsenal/tab/matches/season/1946/

Legend

Football League South

Selected results from the league.

Final League table

FA Cup

References

External links
 Arsenal season-by-season line-ups

1945-46
English football clubs 1945–46 season